C.E.O. is a video game developed by French studio ERE Informatique and Japanese studio Artdink and published by I-Motion for MS-DOS in 1995.

Gameplay
C.E.O. is a game about management training, with features such as stocks and subsidiaries.

Reception

Next Generation reviewed the PC version of the game, rating it two stars out of five, and stated that "When was the last time you saw a real CEO (or anyone for that matter) try to get the busses and trains to run efficiently?  This isn't a bad game, but it just doesn't give a good feeling of cohesion." Computer Game Review was negative toward the game; the magazine summarized, "Playability had to be sacrificed to hire known actors for the video clips."

Reviews
Entertainment Weekly (Oct 13, 1995)
PC Gamer (Oct, 1995)
PC Player - Jul, 1995
PC Games - Jul, 1995
Power Play (Aug, 1995) (German)
PC Format (UK) (Dec, 1995)

References

1995 video games
Artdink games
Business simulation games
DOS games
DOS-only games
Full motion video based games
Video games developed in France
Video games developed in Japan